Hawaiian narrative or mythology, tells stories of nature and life. It is considered a variant of a more general Polynesian narrative, developing its own unique character for several centuries before about 1800. It is associated with the Hawaiian religion. The religion was officially suppressed in the 19th century, but kept alive by some practitioners to the modern day.

Prominent figures and terms in Hawaiian mythology
 Aumakua - spirit of an ancestor or family god
 ʻElepaio - monarch flycatcher
 Kanehekili - god of thunder
 Haumea - goddess of birth
 Hiʻiaka - sister of Pele, daughter of Haumea & Kāne
 Hina - goddess of Moon
 Kahai - Demigod of thunder and lightning
 Kahōālii - god of underworld 
 Kalamainuʻu - lizard goddess
 Kamapuaʻa - warlike god of wild boars, husband of Pele
 Kāmohoalii - shark god
 Kanaloa -  complementary power of Kāne, god of the oceans, consequently the ruler of the Mana. 
 Kāne -  highest of the four major Hawaiian deities, The chief of the Hawaiian trinity, which also consists of his brothers Lono and Ku. In contrast to Lono being the deity of cultivated foods, Kane was the god of wild foods and plants like trees, etc. He was also the god of the forests and jungles with all their gifts like wood, medicinal plants and leaves, etc.
 Kapo
 Kapu - the ancient code of conduct of laws and regulations
 Kapua
 Kaulu - killer of Haumea
 Kihawahine - lizard woman
 Kinilau
 Kū - god of war
 Kumulipo - ancient chant of creation
 Kuula - god of fishermen
 Laka - goddess of hula & fertility/reproducation, love and beauty, wife of god Lono
 Lohiʻau - chief of Kaua'i
 Lono - god of agriculture, peace
 Mana - impersonal force 
 Māui - ancient hero and chief, demigod, shape shifter
 Menehune 
 Nāmaka - sea goddess and sister of Pele
Nuakea - goddess of milk
 Nightmarchers
 Nuu - Hawaiian Noah
 Papa - Goddess of Nature
 Paʻao
 Pakaʻa - god of the wind, gatekeeper of underworld, wife of Kaiwa, Mother of Kaha’i
 Paliuli
 Papahānaumoku
 Pele - goddess of fire and volcanoes
 Poliʻahu - goddesses of snow
 Ukupanipo - another shark god
 Wahieloa
 Waka - lizard goddess
 Wākea - Sky father father of islands

See also
Folklore in Hawaii
Ghosts in Polynesian culture
Hawaiian religion
Māori mythology
Polynesian mythology
Samoan mythology

External links

 , Ed. Thomas G. Thrum
 Hawaiian Mythology by Martha Beckwith

Hawaiiana
 
Hawaiian religion
figures in the Hawaiian religion